The 1953 Kategoria e Dytë was the 9th season of a second-tier association football league in Albania. The season started in March and ended in August. After the interruption of 1952 the Second Division resumed with the formula of the 14 teams in two groups and the final by title and promotions between the two first classified. Spartaku Tiranë wins the title and promotion, but thanks to the Federation's decision to enlarge the First Division to 12 teams, Puna Elbasan also gains promotion, although defeated in the play-off by the penultimate of the major series, and Puna Kavajë, who wins a special play-off with the second in the other group.

Group A

Group B

Final 
Single match played in Kavajë.

Promotion playoffs 
The second-place finishers in the groups played in two match promotion playoffs.

 Spartaku Tiranë, Puna Elbasan and Puna Kavajë were promoted to 1954 National Championship.

Notes

References

Kategoria e Parë seasons
Albania
2